Harry Joseph Gilmore (November 16, 1937 – April 23, 2015) was an American diplomat who served as the first U.S. Ambassador to Armenia.

Early life and education 
Gilmore was born in McKeesport, Pennsylvania and raised in Clairton, Pennsylvania. He graduated from Clairton High School in 1955 as class president. He attended Carnegie Mellon University for two years to study piano, before graduating in 1960 from the University of Pittsburgh. Gilmore then pursued Russian and East European studies at Indiana University.

Career 
Gilmore's rise in the foreign service included working as deputy commandant for international affairs at the United States Army War College. Gilmore served as Deputy Chief of Mission at the American Embassy in Belgrade from 1981-1985, and was the Deputy Director for Eastern European and Yugoslav Affairs at the United States Department of State.

Gilmore was the U.S. Minister and Deputy Commandant of the American Sector in Berlin from 1987-1990. He contributed to ensuring the safety of thousands of East Berliners, who moved to Southern Berlin after the fall of the Berlin Wall.

President George H. W. Bush tapped Gilmore as U.S. ambassador to Armenia in August 1992, but his nomination was not acted upon by the United States Senate. Gilmore was nominated for the second time by President Bill Clinton on April 2, 1993 and confirmed by the Senate.

After his retirement from the foreign service in 1997 after 36 years of service, Mr. Gilmore served as a dean at the Foreign Service Institute in Arlington County, Virginia.

Personal life 
An accomplished pianist, Gilmore would often accompany his wife who was a professional singer. The couple would present American show tunes and other music at U.S. embassy events.

References 

Ambassadors of the United States to Armenia
1937 births
2015 deaths
Clinton administration personnel
University of Pittsburgh alumni
Indiana University alumni
People from McKeesport, Pennsylvania
People from Clairton, Pennsylvania
United States Forest Service officials
United States Foreign Service personnel
Classical pianists
Recipients of the Order of Merit of Berlin